Hilary Bonner (born 1949) is an English crime novelist, best known for her psychological thrillers. Almost all Bonner's novels are inspired by real life events, often drawing on her journalistic past.

Biography

Bonner, a former chairman of the Crime Writers Association, was raised near the North Devon coast in Bideford, where her father was a butcher and ran a tea shop. She was educated at the town's Edgehill College, and went on to be accepted for the Daily Mirror Training Scheme as a 17-year-old school leaver. She acquired her first job in Fleet Street aged 20, ultimately becoming show business editor of three national newspapers, The Sun, The Mail on Sunday, and the Daily Mirror, and assistant editor of one. She left Fleet Street in 1993 and became a full-time author.

Her published work includes ten novels, five non fiction books, two ghosted autobiographies, one ghosted biography, two companions to TV programmers, and a number of short stories.

Work
Her novel The Dead Cry Out draws on her real life experience of living next door to a murderer. Its inspiration is the case of John Allen, Bonner's friend and neighbour during the 1980s, who in 2003 was found guilty of the murder of his wife and two children 27 years previously.

No Reason to Die, her most controversial book, focuses on the series of unexplained deaths at Deepcut Barracks and elsewhere within the British Army. Bonner worked with the families of several of the dead soldiers in order to produce a complex conspiracy theory which, while presented as fiction, was believed by some to have come uncannily close to the truth.

Her novel The Cruellest Game, first published by Macmillan in 2013, is set on Dartmoor. It charts the cataclysmic collapse of a woman's apparently perfect life when she finds that almost everything in it is based upon a lie.

The Times described her as 'keeping on the public agenda the stories our masters would prefer buried.'

Personal life
Actress Amanda Barrie came out as bisexual in her autobiography, It's Not a Rehearsal. Bonner and Barrie have been in a long-term relationship and, on 12 September 2014, they married. The couple live in homes in the Blackdown Hills, Somerset, and London.

Books

Fiction
 The Cruelty of Morning, 1995
 A Fancy to Kill For, 1997
 A Passion So Deadly, 1998
 For Death Comes Softly, 1999
 A Deep Deceit, 2000
 A Kind of Wild Justice, 2001
 A Moment of Madness, 2002
 When the Dead Cry Out, 2003
 No Reason to Die, 2004
 The Cruellest Game, 2013
 Friends to Die For, 2014
 Death Comes First, 2015
 Deadly Dance, 2017
 Wheel of Fire, 2018
 Dreams of Fear, 2019
 Cry Darkness, 2020

Non Fiction
 René and Me: the story of Gorden Kaye. with Gorden Kaye, 1989, 
 Benny: a biography of Benny Hill, with Dennis Kirkland 1992 
 Journeyman, with Clive Gunnell, 1994
 Heartbeat – the Real Life Story 1994
 It's Not a Rehearsal, the autobiography of Amanda Barrie, with Amanda Barrie, 2002

External links
 Official Website

References

1949 births
Living people
English women writers
English LGBT novelists
English crime fiction writers